PGAM is an acronym which may refer to:

Phosphoglycerate mutase, an enzyme
Powers Great American Midways, a traveling carnival midway company in New York